Ilona Marhele (born 5 April 1986) is a Latvian long distance runner who specialises in the marathon. She competed in the women's marathon event at the 2016 Summer Olympics.

References

External links
 
 
 
 

1986 births
Living people
Latvian female long-distance runners
Latvian female marathon runners
Place of birth missing (living people)
Athletes (track and field) at the 2016 Summer Olympics
Olympic athletes of Latvia